The 2018 French Road Cycling Cup was the 27th edition of the French Road Cycling Cup. Compared to the previous season, the same 15 events were held, although the order had changed as the Grand Prix de Denain moved from mid April to mid March and thus became already the second event on the calendar.

The defending champion from the previous season was Laurent Pichon, he was succeeded by Hugo Hofstetter who did not manage to win one of the events but scored enough points to take the title.

Events

Race results

Grand Prix d'Ouverture La Marseillaise

Grand Prix de Denain

Classic Loire Atlantique

Route Adélie

La Roue Tourangelle

Paris–Camembert

Tour du Finistère

Tro-Bro Léon

Grand Prix de Plumelec-Morbihan

Boucles de l'Aulne

Poly Normande

Grand Prix de Fourmies

Tour du Doubs

Grand Prix d'Isbergues

Tour de Vendée

Cup standings

Individual
All competing riders are eligible for this classification.

Young rider classification
All riders younger than 25 are eligible for this classification.

Teams
Only French teams are eligible to be classified in the teams classification.

Notes

References

External links
  

French Road Cycling Cup
French Road Cycling Cup
Road Cycling